Tarutyne is an urban-type settlement in southwestern Ukraine. It is the seat of Bolhrad Raion (district) of Odesa Oblast and is in the historical region of Budjak in southern Bessarabia. Tarutyne hosts the administration of Tarutyne settlement hromada, one of the hromadas of Ukraine. Population: 

Until 18 July 2020, Tarutyne was the administration center of Tarutyne Raion. The raion was abolished in July 2020 as part of the administrative reform of Ukraine, which reduced the number of raions of Odesa Oblast to seven. The area of Tarutyne Raion was merged into Bolhrad Raion.

Notable people
 

Eliezer Shulman (1923–2006), biblical scholar and historian
Lucian Pintilie

References

Urban-type settlements in Bolhrad Raion
1812 establishments in Ukraine
Former German settlements in Odesa Oblast
Akkermansky Uyezd
Cetatea Albă County
Chilia County